Estadio Simeón Magaña is a multi-use stadium in Ahuachapán Department, El Salvador.  It is currently used mostly for football matches and is the home stadium of Once Deportivo.

Once Municipal hierarchy decided to try to secure their own field so they turned to Arturo Simeón Magaña who owned the land around cancha El Zapotón where Once Municipal played. Simeón Magaña Decided to donate the land on condition it could be the pride of Ahuachapán.
Construction began in October 1972 and finished 30 March 1974.

External links
 http://elsalvadorfc.com/esp-esfc/esp1/magana.html

Football venues in El Salvador